The 1975 Iowa Hawkeyes football team represented the University of Iowa in the 1975 Big Ten Conference football season.

Schedule

Roster

Game summaries

at Syracuse

Penn State

Wisconsin

Team players in the 1976 NFL Draft

References

Iowa
Iowa Hawkeyes football seasons
Iowa Hawkeyes football